Ivar Gustaf Albert Sjöberg, best known as Gustav Sjöberg (23 March 1913 – 3 October 2003), was a Swedish football goalkeeper who played for AIK. He also represented Team Sweden in the 1938 FIFA World Cup in France. He was also part of Sweden's squad at the 1936 Summer Olympics, but he did not play in any matches.

References

External links
FIFA profile

1913 births
2003 deaths
Swedish footballers
Sweden international footballers
Association football goalkeepers
Allsvenskan players
AIK Fotboll players
1938 FIFA World Cup players